Claudinei Junio de Souza (born 8 October 1988), simply known as Claudinei, is a Brazilian footballer who plays for CRB as a defensive midfielder.

Honours
Atlético Mineiro
Recopa Sudamericana: 2014
Copa do Brasil: 2014

 América Mineiro
 Campeonato Mineiro: 2016

References

External links
Atlético Mineiro official profile 
 

1988 births
Living people
Sportspeople from Minas Gerais
Brazilian footballers
Association football midfielders
Campeonato Brasileiro Série A players
Campeonato Brasileiro Série B players
Democrata Futebol Clube players
Boa Esporte Clube players
Tombense Futebol Clube players
Figueirense FC players
América Futebol Clube (MG) players
Clube Atlético Mineiro players
Avaí FC players
Associação Ferroviária de Esportes players
Vila Nova Futebol Clube players
Clube de Regatas Brasil players